Rundkollan is a mountain in Lom Municipality in Innlandet county, Norway. The mountain is surrounded by several other notable mountains including Horrungen, Finndalshorungen, and Leirungshøi to the southwest, Ryggehøi to the west, Skardtind to the north, Storbrettingskollen to the east; and Gjerdinghøi and Lauvknubben to the southeast.

The mountain actually has three peaks with prominence over 50 meters.

See also
List of mountains of Norway

References

Lom, Norway
Mountains of Innlandet